Tiger Racing (Tiger Sportscars) is a kit car manufacturer, formed as Tiger Cars Ltd in London in 1989 by Jim Dudley. In 1998 they moved to new premises in Peterborough, Cambridgeshire, and changed their name to Tiger Sportscars Ltd.  Their facilities include a moving floor, two engineering shops, a paint department, a sales and show area, MOT Station, trimming shop and a filled parts department. Tiger also has worldwide agents for shipping their sports cars globally.

Their Z100 model, which is no longer in production, held a  record at 2.8 seconds.

Models
ERA tm
 ERA 30 tm
 ERA HSStm
 Tiger Aviator tm
 Tiger Avon
 Tiger B6
 Tiger R6
 Tiger RS6
 Tiger Z100
 Tiger Cat E1/Supercat/XL

Previous models include
Super Six tm 
Tiger Hawke
Tiger Cub
Tiger "D" type 
Tiger storm
Tiger 250lm

Motorsport
Tiger Racing have their own motorsport series in which owners and drivers race. They compete with other owners at Silverstone, Brands Hatch, Mallory Park, Cadwell Park, Donington Park, Rockingham, Snetterton, Castle Combe and Lydden Hill. They also run a hire drive service of works cars for people to experience racing. They often have racing battles with Caterham and Westfield. They sometimes race in the Intermarque run by the South Eastern Centre of the British Automobile Racing Club.

References

External links
 
 Kitcarplant article on the Tiger GTA (French)

British racecar constructors
Kit car manufacturers
Lotus Seven replicas
Sports car manufacturers